Statistics of Primera Fuerza in season 1911-12.

Overview
It was contested by 3 teams, and Reforma won the championship.

League standings

Top goalscorers
Players sorted first by goals scored, then by last name.

References
Mexico - List of final tables (RSSSF)

1911-12
Mex
1911–12 in Mexican football